Laghi is an Italian word meaning lakes and thus features in numerous toponyms. It may also refer to:

People
 Pio Laghi (1922–2009), Italian cardinal
 Renato Laghi (born 1944), Italian racing cyclist

Places
 Laghi, Veneto, village in the province of Vicenza in north-eastern Italy

See also
 Valle dei Laghi